is a Japanese pop singer. She is a former member of the J-pop girl group BeForU.

Biography

Early life
Minami was born in Yamanashi Prefecture on December 24, 1983.

Career
Combined with Miharu Arisawa and Risa Sotohana, two other members of BeForU, the trio is commonly called BeForU Next. Minami released the song "Under The Sky" with PlatoniX. The song was included in Dance Dance Revolution SuperNova and Beatmania IIDX 12: Happy Sky. She left BeForU in 2008, and now goes under the name .

References

External links
 Aco Tojo's official Blog

BeForU
Living people
1983 births
Japanese women pop singers
Musicians from Yamanashi Prefecture